Usme may refer to:
 Usme, southern locality of Bogotá, Colombia
 Usme Fault, seismic fault named after Usme
 Usme Formation, geologic formation outcropping in Usme
 Usme Synclinal, the valley of the Tunjuelo River
 Portal de Usme (TransMilenio), transport terminal of the TransMilenio, Bogotá